Sekolah Berasrama Penuh Integrasi Rawang (abbreviated SEPINTAR, Arabic: المدرسة راوڠ الداخلية المتكاملة) is a boarding school Sekolah Berasrama Penuh located in Rawang, Selangor in Malaysia.

See also 
 List of schools in Selangor

References

External links
 

Educational institutions established in 2002
2002 establishments in Malaysia
Co-educational boarding schools
Islamic schools in Malaysia
Schools in Selangor